Tyrosine-protein phosphatase non-receptor type 13 is an enzyme that in humans is encoded by the PTPN13 gene.

The protein encoded by this gene is a member of the protein tyrosine phosphatase (PTP) family. PTPs are known to be signaling molecules that regulate a variety of cellular processes including cell growth, differentiation, mitotic cycle, and oncogenic transformation. This PTP is a large protein that possesses a PTP domain at C-terminus, and multiple noncatalytic domains, which include a domain with similarity to band 4.1 superfamily of cytoskeletal-associated proteins, a region consisting of five PDZ domains, and a leucine zipper motif. This PTP was found to interact with, and dephosphorylate Fas receptor, as well as IkappaBalpha through the PDZ domains, which suggested its role in Fas mediated programmed cell death. This PTP was also shown to interact with GTPase-activating protein, and thus may function as a regulator of Rho signaling pathway. Four alternatively spliced transcript variants, which encode distinct proteins, have been reported.

Interactions
PTPN13 has been shown to interact with PKN2.

References

Further reading